Háry János is a 1941 Hungarian musical film directed by Frigyes Bán and starring Antal Páger, Margit Dajka and Kató Bárczy. It is based on the folk opera Háry János which was made into a later film in 1965.

Cast
 Antal Páger - Háry János 
 Margit Dajka - Örzse 
 Kató Bárczy - Mária Lujza 
 Zoltán Makláry - Ferenc császár 
 Vilma Medgyaszay - Császárné 
 Sándor Pethes - Ebelasztin lovag 
 József Juhász - Marci bácsi 
 Judit Csermely -Udvarhölgy 
 Mária Deésy - Udvarhölgy 
 Lajos Kelemen - Muszka határõr 
 Ernö Mihályi - Napóleon 
 László Misoga - Hírnök 
 Sándor Naszódy - Diák 
 István Palotai - Katona 
 Ferenc Pethes - Silbak 
 György Solthy - Magyar határõr 
 Gyula Szőreghy - Tábornok

External links

1941 films
1941 musical comedy films
Hungarian musical comedy films
1940s Hungarian-language films
Films directed by Frigyes Bán
Films based on operas
Napoleonic Wars films
Depictions of Napoleon on film
Hungarian black-and-white films